The Women's keirin was held on 21 October 2012. 11 riders participated.

Medalists

Results

Heats
First 3 riders in each heat qualified for the final, remainder went to the 7–11 final. It was held at 11:27.

Heat 1

Heat 2

Finals
It was held at 18:01.

Final 7–11 places

Final

References

Women's keirin
European Track Championships – Women's keirin